Oil Creek may refer to:

Communities
Branchville, Indiana, also known as Oil Creek
Oil Creek Township, Pennsylvania, in Crawford County
Oil Creek Township, Pennsylvania, in Venango County

Streams

Alaska
Oil Creek (Kodiak Island County, Alaska), a tributary of the Pacific Ocean
Oil Creek (Valdez-Cordova, Alaska), a tributary of the Gulf of Alaska
Oil Creek (Valdez-Cordova, Alaska), a tributary of Katalla Slough

California
Oil Creek (Contra Costa County, California), a tributary of Sand Creek
Oil Creek (Fresno County, California), a tributary of Los Gatos Creek
Oil Creek (Humboldt County, California), a tributary of Upper North Fork Mattole River
Oil Creek (Humboldt County, California), a tributary of the Pacific Ocean
Oil Creek (Humboldt County, California), a tributary of the Eel River
Oil Creek (San Mateo County, California), a tributary of Pescadero Creek

Colorado
Oil Creek (Teller County, Colorado), a tributary of Fourmile Creek

Indiana
Oil Creek (Marion County, Indiana), a tributary of Payne Branch
Oil Creek (Perry County, Indiana), a tributary of Ohio River

Missouri
Oil Creek (Jackson County, Missouri), a tributary of Little Blue River

New York
Oil Creek (Cattaraugus County, New York), a tributary of Olean Creek

Oklahoma
Oil Creek (Johnston County, Oklahoma), a tributary of Washita River, left
Oil Creek (Johnston County, Oklahoma), a tributary of Washita River via Randolph Lake, right
Oil Creek (Le Flore County, Oklahoma), a tributary of Bear Creek
Oil Creek (Love County, Oklahoma), a tributary of Hickory Creek

Pennsylvania
Oil Creek (Elk County, Pennsylvania), a tributary of West Branch Clarion River
Oil Creek (Lebanon County, Pennsylvania), a tributary of Swatara Creek
Oil Creek (Venango County, Pennsylvania), a tributary of the Allegheny River
Oil Creek (York County, Pennsylvania), a tributary of Codorus Creek

Texas
Oil Creek (San Jacinto County, Texas), a tributary of East Fork San Jacinto River

Virginia
Oil Creek (Greene County, Virginia), a tributary of Welsh Run

West Virginia
Oil Creek (Braxton County, West Virginia), a tributary of Little Kanawha River

Wyoming
Oil Creek (Weston County, Wyoming), a tributary of Beaver Creek

Other uses
 Oil Creek State Park, Pennsylvania

See also
 Oil Creek and Titusville Railroad, Pennsylvania